Indian River State College (IRSC) is a public college with a main campus in Fort Pierce, Florida. It is part of the Florida College System and serves the counties of Indian River, Martin, Okeechobee and St. Lucie on the Treasure Coast region of Florida.

History
The college was established in 1959 as Indian River Junior College and located in a former public school building in Fort Pierce. IRJC moved to its current main campus on Virginia Avenue in 1963 after the city of Fort Pierce donated the site to the institution. In 1970, the Board of Trustees decided a name more fitting of the College's service to the community was needed, and it was renamed Indian River Community College. This was in keeping with the national trend for public junior colleges to drop the word "junior" in favor of 'Community."  Within the confines of the College, the school is called The River or 'the ersk', pronouncing the school's acronym, IRSC. The school's mascot is the Pioneer.

On 10 September 2007, IRCC's Board of Trustees voted unanimously to change the college's name to Indian River College, as it began its transition into a four-year institution. The name change needed to be enacted into law by the Florida Legislature. Ultimately, the school's name was changed to Indian River State College by the college's board of trustees effective 1 July 2008.

Campus

The main campus occupies a  site that was formerly the Fort Pierce landfill site. It has branch campuses in Okeechobee (Dixon Hendry campus), Port St. Lucie  (Pruitt campus), Stuart (Chastain campus) and Vero Beach (Mueller campus) plus additional learning centers facilities in the area.

In August 2020, the main campus in Fort Pierce was named the Massey campus after the retiring president Edwin R. Massey.

Academics
Nine bachelor's degree programs have been added in middle and secondary school teacher education in math and science, exceptional student education, nursing, organizational management, public safety administration and healthcare management. Indian River State College is accredited by the Commission on Colleges of the Southern Association of Colleges and Schools to award Associate and Baccalaureate Degrees. The institution offers additional educational programs such as Technical Certificates and Applied Technology Diplomas. The institution also offers an Adult High School Program that allows adults that have not graduated from high school to continue earning credits that may be counted towards their completion of the GED. IRSC also participates in the dual enrollment state program to allow students to take college classes at a discount while in a public high school. They host the Clark Advanced Learning Center, a technology-based high school, as a joint venture between the Martin County School District and IRSC.

In September 2014, the college was named as one of the ten best community colleges in the United States by the Aspen Institute.
In 2018, the college was regarded runner-up for the best state college in the United States by the Aspen Institute. Then again in 2019, it won another from the Aspen Institute, for the #1 best state college in the United States, tied with Miami Dade College in Miami, FL.

In 2022, the college began the "Promise Program", which offered tuition-free associate degrees to Treasure Coast and Okeechobee county area public high school graduates. The program resulted in a larger freshman class at IRSC campus.

Athletics
The college athletic teams, which are nicknamed the Pioneers, compete in the Southern Conference of the Florida State College Activities Association, a body of the National Junior College Athletic Association Region 8. The college has a very successful swimming and diving team. Indian River men's swimming and diving team has won 48 straight NJCAA swimming and diving championships, and the women's team has won 41 straight national championships.
With 48 consecutive wins, IRSC currently holds the title to the longest unbroken U.S. championship winning streak in any sport at the collegiate level. The women's team brought home their 44th overall title and extended their consecutive titles to 41.

Notable people

 Mike Bianco, Head coach of the University of Mississippi baseball team
 Sion Brinn, Olympic swimmer
 Rob Cordemans, Olympic baseball player for the Netherlands
 Michael Marrone, heavyweight boxer
 Omar Mateen, Islamic terrorist and mass murderer who perpetrated the Pulse Orlando nightclub shooting
 John McCormack, college baseball coach at Florida Atlantic
 Rusty Meacham, professional baseball player
 Breanna Myles, Miss Teen USA 2021
 Angel Pagán, professional baseball player
 Steve Pearce, professional baseball player
 Ralph Poppell, member of the Florida House of Representatives
 Fabrizio Scaccia, professional football player
 Luke Scott, professional baseball player
 Cory Spangenberg, professional baseball player
 Gordon Touw Ngie Tjouw, Olympic swimmer
 Jonny Venters, professional baseball player

References

External links

 

 
Florida College System
Fort Pierce, Florida
Schools in St. Lucie County, Florida
Two-year colleges in the United States
Education in Indian River County, Florida
Education in Martin County, Florida
Education in Okeechobee County, Florida
Education in St. Lucie County, Florida
Educational institutions established in 1959
Universities and colleges accredited by the Southern Association of Colleges and Schools
1959 establishments in Florida